Mexican Bus Ride (original title in , "Ascent to Heaven") is a 1952 Mexican comedy film directed by Luis Buñuel and starring Lilia Prado. It was entered into the 1952 Cannes Film Festival.

Plot 
Much like the film The Illusion Rides the Tram, directed by Buñuel two years later, focuses on a tram ride, this film is essentially about a bus ride.

When Oliverio's mother is dying, she wants to quickly write a will so that the youngest son gets his share and the two older brothers don't collect everything. Because his mother is too weak to travel, Oliverio is supposed to bring a notary from the city to her. So he takes the bus, but unforeseen events constantly interrupt the journey. These interruptions affect all aspects of life; a birth as well as a funeral and a breakdown when the bus hits a river and breaks down. The most pleasant companion for Oliverio on this journey is the seductive Raquel. In the end, Oliverio returns to his mother, who has died in the meantime, without the notary, but can still secure his share of the inheritance by means of a fingerprint under the will she wants.

Cast
Lilia Prado as Raquel
Esteban Márquez as Oliverio Grajales
Luis Aceves Castañeda as Silvestre
Manuel Dondé as Eladio Gonzales
Roberto Cobo as Juan
Beatriz Ramos as Elisa
Manuel Noriega
Roberto Meyer as Don Nemesio Álvarez y Villalbazo
Pedro Elviro
Leonor Gómez as Doña Linda

References

External links 
 

1952 films
1950s Spanish-language films
Mexican black-and-white films
1952 comedy films
Films directed by Luis Buñuel
Mexican comedy films
1950s Mexican films